Christophe Mulumba-Tshimanga (born January 6, 1993), sometimes called Chris Mulumba, is a professional Canadian football linebacker and special teams player for the Ottawa Redblacks of the Canadian Football League (CFL). Born in the Democratic Republic of the Congo and raised in Montreal, he attended the Kent School (class of 2012) in Connecticut before playing college football as a linebacker with the Maine Black Bears.

Professional career
Mulumba-Tshimanga was drafted in the third round (22nd overall) of the 2017 CFL Draft by the Edmonton Eskimos. Prior to signing with Edmonton, he received a tryout with the Tampa Bay Buccaneers.  On July 28, 2017, he made his first start at linebacker, following injuries to Cory Greenwood, Adam Konar and Blair Smith. He played in 43 games over three season, recording 53 defensive tackles, 34 special teams tackles, five sacks, and four forced fumbles. He became a free agent on February 11, 2020 and signed with the Ottawa Redblacks to a one-year contract that same day. He re-signed with the Redblacks on February 5, 2021. He was placed on the suspended list on July 9, 2021.

References

External links
Ottawa Redblacks bio

1993 births
Living people
Edmonton Elks players
Ottawa Redblacks players
Maine Black Bears football players
Democratic Republic of the Congo expatriate sportspeople
Canadian football people from Montreal
Players of Canadian football from Quebec
Kent School alumni
Canadian football linebackers
American football linebackers
Democratic Republic of the Congo players of Canadian football
Democratic Republic of the Congo players of American football
Black Canadian players of American football
21st-century Democratic Republic of the Congo people